The Croatian Embassy in Washington D.C. is the primary  Croatian diplomatic mission to the United States. 

It is located on Embassy Row at 2343 Massachusetts Avenue, Northwest Washington DC in the Embassy Row neighborhood, near Dupont Circle. The embassy also operates Consulates-General in Anchorage, Chicago, Houston, Kansas City, Los Angeles, New Orleans, New York, Pittsburgh, and 
Seattle.

The embassy represents the interests of Croatia and Croatian citizens in the United States and conducts the majority of diplomatic work on such interests within the US.

, the Ambassador is Pjer Šimunović.

Building
Previously the building had been home to the Austrian embassy, which vacated the premises for larger quarters, and sold the structure to Croatia in 1993.  The purchase and renovation of the building was largely paid for by the Croatian-American community.  In front of the embassy is a large sculpture of St. Jerome by Croatian sculptor Ivan Meštrović.

See also
 Croatian diplomatic missions

References

Croatian Embassy event on March 28th by IPG to attend. 
https://www.facebook.com/events/387449151392548/

External links

Official site

Croatia
Washington, D.C.
Croatia–United States relations
Croatia